Chiara Marchitelli (born 4 May 1985) is a former Italian football goalkeeper who played for Inter Milan of Serie A. She has won four league titles with SS Lazio, ASD Fiammamonza and ACF Brescia Femminile (twice).

International career
Marchitelli made her senior Italy national team debut in September 2006, a 1–0 friendly win over the Republic of Ireland at Richmond Park, Dublin. Although she had already been a reserve goalkeeper in Italy's squad at UEFA Women's Euro 2005.

References

External links 

1985 births
Living people
Italian women's footballers
Italy women's international footballers
Serie A (women's football) players
S.S. Lazio Women 2015 players
Footballers from Rome
A.C.F. Brescia Calcio Femminile players
U.P.C. Tavagnacco players
Women's association football goalkeepers
Florentia San Gimignano S.S.D. players
ASD Fiammamonza 1970 players
Inter Milan (women) players
2019 FIFA Women's World Cup players
Roma Calcio Femminile players
UEFA Women's Euro 2017 players